Miguel Washington Ibarra Tixe (born September 8, 1984 in New York City) is an Ecuadorian professional footballer. He formerly played for Barcelona and Quito-based club Universidad Católica.

Career

Club
Miguel Ibarra began his career in the youth ranks of ESPOLI. In 2003, he made his debut with the senior side and was an important player for the club appearing in 162 league matches during his six seasons with the Quito side. In 2010, he signed with Universidad Católica and the attack minded right back made 25 league appearances and scored 2 goals with his new club.

For the 2011 season Ibarra was sent on loan to Ecuador's Barcelona Sporting Club. In 2012 his loan period was extended and he helped the club in capturing its 12th Serie A title. In 2013, he was sent on loan to Deportivo Quito  where he made 30 league appearances. In January 2014 Ibarra went on trial with Major League Soccer side New York Red Bulls.

International
Ibarra was first called up for the Ecuador national team in 2009 for 2010 World Cup qualifiers against Brazil and Paraguay, but did not play. He earned his first cap for the national team starting against El Salvador on May 27, 2009.

Honors

Club
Barcelona
 Serie A (1): 2012

References

External links
Ibarra's FEF Player Card

futbolecuador.com

1984 births
Living people
Soccer players from New York City
American people of Ecuadorian descent
American emigrants to Ecuador
People with acquired Ecuadorian citizenship
Ecuadorian footballers
Ecuador international footballers
C.D. ESPOLI footballers
C.D. Universidad Católica del Ecuador footballers
Barcelona S.C. footballers
S.D. Quito footballers
American soccer players
Association football defenders